The 2021–22 CAF Confederation Cup (officially the 2021–22 TotalEnergies CAF Confederation Cup for sponsorship reasons) was the 19th edition of Africa's secondary club football tournament organized by the Confederation of African Football (CAF) under the current CAF Confederation Cup title after the merger of CAF Cup and African Cup Winners' Cup.

The defending champions Raja Casablanca were unable to defend their title as they advanced to the group stage of the that season's CAF Champions League. The final was won by RS Berkane of Morocco 5–4 on penalties after a 1–1 draw after 120 minutes of regulation time against Orlando Pirates and RS Berkane at the Godswill Akpabio International Stadium in Uyo, Nigeria, capturing their second title in the process.

As winners, RS Berkane earned the right to play against the winners of the 2021–22 CAF Champions League, Wydad Casablanca, in the 2022 CAF Super Cup.

Association team allocation
All 54 CAF member associations may enter the competition, with the 12 highest ranked associations according to their CAF 5-Year Ranking eligible to enter two teams in the competition. As a result, theoretically a maximum of 68 teams could enter the tournament (plus 16 teams eliminated from the CAF Champions League which enter the play-off round) – although this level has never been reached.

For the 2020–21 season, CAF utilized the 2016–2020 CAF 5-Year Ranking, which calculates points for each entrant association based on their clubs’ performance over the previous 5 seasons in CAF's club competitions. The criteria for points are as follows:

The points are multiplied by a coefficient according to the year as follows:
2020–21: x 5
2019–20: × 4
2018–19: × 3
2018: × 2
2017: × 1

Teams

The following 49 teams from 37 associations entered the competition.
Teams in bold received a bye to the second round.
The other teams entered the first round.

Associations are shown according to their 2017–2021 CAF 5-Year Ranking – those with a ranking score have their rank and score (in parentheses) indicated.

 Both the winners Simba SC and runner-ups Young Africans S.C. of the 2020–21 Tanzania FA Cup qualified for the 2021-22 CAF Champions League resulting in the slot usually allocated to the winner or runner-up of the Tanzania FA Cup to be awarded to the fourth placed team in the 2020–21 Tanzanian Premier League.

Notes

Schedule

Qualifying rounds

First round

Second round

Play-off round
Eliminated from 2021–22 CAF Champions League:

Group stage

In the group stage, each group was played on a home-and-away round-robin basis. The winners and runners-up of each group advanced to the quarter-finals of the knockout stage.

Group A

Group B

Group C

Group D

Knockout stage

Bracket

Quarter-finals

Semi-finals

Final

Top goalscorers

See also
2021–22 CAF Champions League

Notes

References

External links

1
1